Soleilmoon Recordings is an American record label that began in 1987 as a cassette label, operating from the back of a record shop called the Ooze in Portland, Oregon, US.

The first releases were by Smegma, Muslimgauze, Coil, and Nocturnal Emissions. In 1991 the shop was sold and Soleilmoon became a full-time label.

Hate music designation 

On February 15, 2017, Soleilmoon was declared a provider of hate music by the Southern Poverty Law Center for distributing albums by Death in June, and Boyd Rice's project NON. Charles Powne, the label's owner, denied that Soleilmoon was racist, and said that Douglas Pearce and Rice are not racist either. This designation has since been removed from the Southern Poverty Law Center's Hate Map without comment.

Soleilmoon artists

See also
 List of record labels

References

External links
 Official site

American record labels
Record labels established in 1987
Experimental music record labels
Ambient music record labels
Electronic music record labels
Noise music record labels
Industrial record labels
Companies based in Portland, Oregon
Oregon record labels
Privately held companies based in Oregon
1987 establishments in Oregon